Zinkovo is a rural locality (a village) in Levichanskoye Rural Settlement, Kosinsky District, Perm Krai, Russia. The population was 14 as of 2010. There are 2 streets.

Geography 
Zinkovo is located 51 km south of Kosa (the district's administrative centre) by road. Lyampino is the nearest rural locality.

References 

Rural localities in Kosinsky District